Thomas Raymond Chism (born May 9, 1955) is an American former Major League Baseball player from Chester, Pennsylvania.

Career
Drafted by the Baltimore Orioles out of Widener University in 1974, Chism made his Major League debut for the Orioles on September 13, 1979. He would go on to appear in six games mainly as a first baseman.

References

Baltimore Orioles players
Baseball players from Pennsylvania
Chester High School alumni
Sportspeople from Chester, Pennsylvania
Widener Pride baseball players
1955 births
Living people
Charlotte O's players
Evansville Triplets players
Miami Orioles players
Rochester Red Wings players
Toledo Mud Hens players